North London Credit Union Limited is a not-for-profit member-owned financial co-operative, based in Enfield and operating in the north London boroughs of Enfield, Barnet, Haringey, Waltham Forest and southern Hertfordshire. The credit union manages assets in excess of £3 million.

History

North London Enterprise Club Credit Union was formed in 1994, for members of the North London Enterprise Club. It became North London Chamber and Enterprise Credit Union in 1997, in association with North London Chamber of Commerce and North London Enterprise Credit Union in 2006, before adopting the current name in 2009.

In 2016, the credit union was awarded a grant of £50,000 by the Lloyds Banking Group Credit Union Development Fund to support its capital asset ratio, loan growth and future sustainability.

Activities
A member of the Association of British Credit Unions Limited, registered under the Industrial and Provident Societies Acts, North London Credit Union is authorised by the Prudential Regulation Authority and regulated by the Financial Conduct Authority and PRA. Ultimately, like the banks and building societies, members' savings are protected against business failure by the Financial Services Compensation Scheme.

See also
Credit unions in the United Kingdom
British co-operative movement

References

External links
North London Credit Union
Association of British Credit Unions

Credit unions of the United Kingdom
Financial services companies based in London
Banks established in 1994
1994 establishments in England